District 2 of the Texas Senate is a senatorial district that serves all of Delta, Fannin, Hopkins, Hunt, Kaufman, Rains, Rockwall and Van Zandt counties, and portions of Dallas county in the U.S. state of Texas. The current Senator from District 2 is Bob Hall.

Election history
Election history of District 2 from 1992.

Most recent elections

2018

2014

2010

2006

Previous elections

2002

2000

1996

1994

1992

Federal and statewide results in District 2

District officeholders

References

02